Branislav "Bane" Jevremović (born October 2, 1970) is a Serbian tennis coach, one of the most successful tennis coaches in Serbia.

Career
His coaching career started in 1989 at TK Partizan. He has participated in the development of many leading tennis players, including Nenad Zimonjić, Aleksandra Krunić, Mate Pavić, Marcin Matkowski, Robert Lindstedt, Nadiia Kichenok, Lyudmyla Kichenok. Currently he is a university tennis coach at Schüttler Waske Tennis-University.

He is a member of different tennis coach organizations such as: International Tennis Federation, United States Professional Tennis Register, Global Professional Tennis Coach Association.

As coach of Nenad Zimonjić he was active in the Serbian Davis Cup team from 2007.

References 

Serbian tennis coaches
1970 births
Living people
Place of birth missing (living people)